The 2018–19 Championnat National season was the 21st season since the establishment of the Championnat National, which serves as the third division of the French football league system.

Team changes

To National
Promoted from National 2
Marignane-Gignac
Villefranche
Drancy
Le Mans

Relegated from Ligue 2
Bourg-Péronnas
Quevilly-Rouen
Tours

From National
Relegated to National 2
Les Herbiers
Marseille Consolat
Créteil

Promoted to Ligue 2
Red Star
Béziers
Grenoble

Stadia and locations

League table

Promotion play-offs
A promotion play-off was held at the end of the season between the 18th-placed Ligue 2 team and 3rd-placed team of the 2018–19 Championnat National. This was played over two legs on 28 May and 2 June.

Le Mans won 3–2 on aggregate and were promoted to Ligue 2, while Gazélec Ajaccio were relegated to the Championnat National.

Top scorers

References

Championnat National seasons
3
France